is a fighting game developed by Examu’s Team Arcana and published by Nitroplus. The game crosses over heroines from various visual novels and games released by Nitroplus, as well as those from manga and anime series that Nitroplus writers have been involved with. The game was released in arcades on April 30, 2015 and was released on PlayStation 3 and PlayStation 4 in collaboration with Marvelous Entertainment's Marvelous Inc. on December 10, 2015. Marvelous USA published the game in North America on February 2, 2016. It was later released on Windows on December 8, 2016. The game originates from the doujin game Nitro+ Royale: Heroines Duel, which is stated as its predecessor.

Gameplay
The game uses five buttons; light attack, medium attack, heavy attack, escape action, and heavy action. The escape action button can be used to perform evasive maneuvers and guards while heavy actions can be used to push an opponent back. Players can perform Infinite Blasts, which can interrupt an opponent's attack, Variable Rushes, which allows for surprise combos, and Lethal Blazes, which serve as the game's super combo attacks. Players can also choose two support characters which they can summon to assist them.

Characters
There are 32 characters which are split up into playable characters and support characters. Super Sonico was initially a support character, but was later also made playable, as of console release. An original character, who is a dark palette swap and final boss version of Al Azif, Al Azif Ex Mortis is the non-playable final boss of the game, created by Mugen Yoguruma, act as a copy of the Necronomicon, crafted from the fragments of the Al Azifs from the infinite universes in which Demonbane failed. At the end of the story mode, Ex Mortis is defeated and absorbed by Al Azif, who gains all of Ex Mortis' memories, as well as the completion of her soul.

Playable characters
 Heart Aino (Arcana Heart) 
 Al Azif (Demonbane series)
 Anna (Gekkō no Carnevale)
 Ethica (Tokyo Necro)
 Ein (Phantom of Inferno)
 Homura (Senran Kagura) 
 Ignis (Jingai Makyō)
 Mora (Vampirdzhija Vjedogonia)
 Satsurikuin Ouka (OKStyle mascot)
 Ruili (Kikokugai: The Cyber Slayer)
 Saber (Fate) (Fate/Zero incarnation) 
 Muramasa Sansei (Full Metal Daemon: Muramasa)
 Saya (Saya no Uta)
 Super Sonico

Support characters
 Akane Tsunemori (Psycho-Pass) 
 Alushia (Hakubō no Dendōshi)
 Amy (Gargantia on the Verdurous Planet) 
 Angela Balzac (Expelled from Paradise) 
 Another Blood (Kishin Hishō Demonbane)
 Anri (Tenshi no Nichō Kenjū -Angelos Armas-)
 Aoi Mukō (Kimi to Kanojo to Kanojo no Koi)
 Carol (Guilty Crown: Lost Christmas) 
 Dragon (Dra†KoI)
 Ishima Kaigen (Hanachirasu)
 Kuro no Franco/Franco il Nero (Zoku Satsuriku no Jango -Jikogu no Shōkin Kubi-)
 Miyuki Sone (Kimi to Kanojo to Kanojo no Koi)
 Mugen Yoguruma (D.Y.N. Freaks)
 Natsumi Aibara (Hello, world.)
 Sakura (Axanael)
 Spica (Sumaga)
 Super Sonico
 Yoishi Mitsurugi (Phenomeno)
 Yuki Takeya (School-Live!)

Other characters
 Saki Tsuzura (Arcana Heart) 
 Mirai (Senran Kagura) 

 Guest character.
 DLC character in PlayStation version. Available in PC version by default.

Reception

Nitroplus Blasterz: Heroines Infinite Duel has received mixed reviews from critics, scoring 70/100 on Metacritic, and 69.53% on GameRankings.

Kyle LeClair of Hardcore Gamer gave the game a 4 out of 5 saying, "In the end, those who are more familiar with works of Nitroplus will get the most out of Nitroplus Blasterz (shockingly enough), but even those with no prior knowledge of the included franchises should easily be able to enjoy it." Kyle MacGregor from Destructoid rated the game an 8/10 saying, "Nitroplus Blasterz is a fast, smooth, strategic, and generally entertaining fighting game that has found a happy medium between accessibility and depth." Conversely TJ Marinelli of Crash Landed praised the game's fighting mechanics but was disappointed by the thin story and lack of animation in each of the background stages. Corey Lanier of Shoryuken.com also praised the game mechanics and characters, but criticized the lack of documentation claiming the game left players "to fend for themselves," and criticized the online aspects of the game, stating that Examu "went SNK Playmore's direction of cheaping out on their lesser known titles."

References

External links

2015 video games
Arcade video games
Crossover fighting games
Nitroplus
PlayStation 3 games
PlayStation 4 games
NESiCAxLive games
Video games developed in Japan
Video games with cross-platform play
Windows games
Multiplayer and single-player video games
Examu games